Czech Lion Award for Extraordinary Contribution to Czech Cinema is an annual award given to person who contributed to Czech cinema by his or her life work.

Winners

References

Czech Lion Awards
Awards established in 1993